No Goodbyes may refer to:

Albums
 No Goodbyes (album), a 1977 album by Daryl Hall & John Oates

Songs
"No Goodbyes" (Sherman Brothers song)
"No Goodbyes" (Linda song)
"No Goodbyes" (The Subways song)
"No Goodbyes", a 1978 single by Curtis Mayfield from the album Do It All Night
"No Goodbyes", a 2003 song by Blue from Guilty
"No Goodbyes", song by Dua Lipa from Dua Lipa